Jérôme Brisard (born 24 March 1986) is a French football referee who officiates in Ligue 1. He has been a FIFA referee since 2018, and is ranked as a UEFA first category referee.

Refereeing career
In 2015, Brisard began officiating in Ligue 2, before being promoted to Ligue 1 in the second half of the 2016–17 season. He officiated his first Ligue 1 match on 14 January 2017 between Montpellier and Dijon. In 2018, he was put on the FIFA referees list. On 17 February 2018, he officiated a match in the 2017–18 Swiss Super League between Basel and St. Gallen. He officiated his first UEFA competition match on 12 July 2018, a meeting between Albanian club Partizani and Slovenian club Maribor in the 2018–19 UEFA Europa League first qualifying round. He officiated his first senior international match on 15 November 2018 between Israel and Guatemala. On 31 July 2020, Brisard officiated the 2020 Coupe de la Ligue Final between Paris Saint-Germain and Lyon.

On 21 April 2021, Brisard was selected as a video assistant referee for UEFA Euro 2020, to be held across Europe in June and July 2021.

References

External links
 
 
 Profile at EU-Football.info

1986 births
Living people
French football referees
21st-century French people